The 1983–84 season for the Los Angeles Lakers saw them lose in the 1984 NBA Finals against Larry Bird's Boston Celtics in seven well-fought games. The Lakers were coming off of an NBA Finals loss the previous season to the Julius Erving and Moses Malone-led Philadelphia 76ers, in which they were swept in four games. The Lakers, powered by Kareem Abdul-Jabbar (who broke the NBA's all-time total points record) and Magic Johnson with his 13.1 assists per game (tops in '84), ended up winning 54 games in the 1983–84 NBA season. On April 5, 1984, Kareem Abdul-Jabbar had a 12-foot shot over Mark Eaton of the Utah Jazz to surpass Wilt Chamberlain as the NBA's all-time leading scorer with 31,421 points.

In the playoffs, the Lakers defeated the Kansas City Kings in the first round, the Dallas Mavericks in the second, and the Phoenix Suns in the 1984 Western Conference Finals in order to advance to what is called the "greatest NBA Finals in history", against Larry Bird's formidable, 62–20 Boston Celtics. The Lakers' easy 137–104 victory in Game 3 of the Finals caused Bird to label teammates "sissies". The words inspired the Celtics, and shot down the Lakers, with the Celtics winning Game 7 by a score of 111–102, a Laker heartbreaker, and still, arguably, the most memorable Finals of the 1980s.

Draft picks

Roster

Regular season

Season standings

z – clinched division title
y – clinched division title
x – clinched playoff spot

Record vs. opponents

Game log

Regular season

|- align="center" bgcolor="#ccffcc"
| 7
| November 11
| Phoenix
| W 119–105
|
|
|
| The Forum
| 5–2
|- align="center" bgcolor="#ccffcc"
| 9
| November 15
| Milwaukee
| W 126–97
|
|
|
| The Forum
| 7–2

|- align="center" bgcolor="#ffcccc"
| 21
| December 15
| @ Phoenix
| L 104–114
|
|
|
| Arizona Veterans Memorial Coliseum
| 14–7

|- align="center" bgcolor="#ffcccc"
| 39
| January 19
| @ Phoenix
| L 123–138
|
|
|
| Arizona Veterans Memorial Coliseum
| 24–15
|- align="center" bgcolor="#ccffcc"
| 41
| January 24
| Phoenix
| W 116–110
|
|
|
| The Forum
| 25–16

|- align="center" bgcolor="#ccffcc"
| 48
| February 8
| @ Boston
| W 111–109
|
|
|
| Boston Garden
| 32–16
|- align="center" bgcolor="#ccffcc"
| 55
| February 24
| Boston
| W 116–108
|
|
|
| The Forum
| 32–16

|- align="center" bgcolor="#ccffcc"
| 67
| March 20
| @ Milwaukee
| W 99–94
|
|
|
| MECCA Arena
| 45–22
|- align="center" bgcolor="#ccffcc"
| 73
| March 31
| @ Phoenix
| W 119–97
|
|
|
| Arizona Veterans Memorial Coliseum
| 49–24

|- align="center" bgcolor="#ffcccc"
| 82
| April 15
| Phoenix
| L 114–123
|
|
|
| The Forum
| 54–28

Playoffs

|- align="center" bgcolor="#ccffcc"
| 1
| April 18
| Kansas City
| W 116–105
| Magic Johnson (26)
| three players tied (7)
| Magic Johnson (11)
| The Forum13,918
| 1–0
|- align="center" bgcolor="#ccffcc"
| 2
| April 20
| Kansas City
| W 109–102
| Kareem Abdul-Jabbar (26)
| Kareem Abdul-Jabbar (11)
| Magic Johnson (11)
| The Forum14,986
| 2–0
|- align="center" bgcolor="#ccffcc"
| 3
| April 22
| @ Kansas City
| W 108–102
| Kareem Abdul-Jabbar (23)
| Johnson, Worthy (10)
| Magic Johnson (13)
| Kemper Arena7,261
| 3–0
|-

|- align="center" bgcolor="#ccffcc"
| 1
| April 28
| Dallas
| W 134–91
| Mike McGee (25)
| Kurt Rambis (8)
| Magic Johnson (11)
| The Forum13,512
| 1–0
|- align="center" bgcolor="#ccffcc"
| 2
| May 1
| Dallas
| W 117–101
| Magic Johnson (27)
| Kareem Abdul-Jabbar (10)
| Magic Johnson (11)
| The Forum15,298
| 2–0
|- align="center" bgcolor="#ffcccc"
| 3
| May 4
| @ Dallas
| L 115–125
| Magic Johnson (24)
| Bob McAdoo (8)
| Magic Johnson (14)
| Reunion Arena17,007
| 2–1
|- align="center" bgcolor="#ccffcc"
| 4
| May 6
| @ Dallas
| W 122–115 (OT)
| Kareem Abdul-Jabbar (33)
| Johnson, Abdul-Jabbar (11)
| Magic Johnson (16)
| Reunion Arena17,007
| 3–1
|- align="center" bgcolor="#ccffcc"
| 5
| May 8
| Dallas
| W 115–99
| Mike McGee (27)
| three players tied (6)
| Magic Johnson (15)
| The Forum16,644
| 4–1
|-

|- align="center" bgcolor="#ccffcc"
| 1
| May 12
| Phoenix
| W 110–94
| Bob McAdoo (20)
| Kareem Abdul-Jabbar (10)
| Michael Cooper (10)
| The Forum12,825
| 1–0
|- align="center" bgcolor="#ccffcc"
| 2
| May 15
| Phoenix
| W 118–102
| Kareem Abdul-Jabbar (21)
| Kareem Abdul-Jabbar (10)
| Magic Johnson (24)
| The Forum16,578
| 2–0
|- align="center" bgcolor="#ffcccc"
| 3
| May 18
| @ Phoenix
| L 127–135
| Kareem Abdul-Jabbar (31)
| three players tied (8)
| Magic Johnson (13)
| Arizona Veterans Memorial Coliseum14,660
| 2–1
|- align="center" bgcolor="#ccffcc"
| 4
| May 20
| @ Phoenix
| W 126–115
| Kareem Abdul-Jabbar (31)
| three players tied (7)
| Magic Johnson (15)
| Arizona Veterans Memorial Coliseum14,660
| 3–1
|- align="center" bgcolor="#ffcccc"
| 5
| May 23
| Phoenix
| L 121–126
| Kareem Abdul-Jabbar (28)
| Bob McAdoo (8)
| Magic Johnson (13)
| The Forum16,848
| 3–2
|- align="center" bgcolor="#ccffcc"
| 6
| May 25
| @ Phoenix
| W 99–97
| James Worthy (22)
| Magic Johnson (11)
| Magic Johnson (13)
| Arizona Veterans Memorial Coliseum14,660
| 4–2
|-

|- align="center" bgcolor="#ccffcc"
| 1
| May 27
| @ Boston
| W 115–109
| Kareem Abdul-Jabbar (32)
| Kareem Abdul-Jabbar (8)
| Magic Johnson (10)
| Boston Garden14,890
| 1–0
|- align="center" bgcolor="#ffcccc"
| 2
| May 31
| @ Boston
| L 121–124 (OT)
| James Worthy (29)
| Magic Johnson (10)
| Magic Johnson (10)
| Boston Garden14,890
| 1–1
|- align="center" bgcolor="#ccffcc"
| 3
| June 3
| Boston
| W 137–104
| Kareem Abdul-Jabbar (34)
| Magic Johnson (11)
| Magic Johnson (21)
| The Forum17,505
| 2–1
|- align="center" bgcolor="#ffcccc"
| 4
| June 6
| Boston
| L 125–129 (OT)
| Kareem Abdul-Jabbar (32)
| Magic Johnson (11)
| Magic Johnson (17)
| The Forum17,505
| 2–2
|- align="center" bgcolor="#ffcccc"
| 5
| June 8
| @ Boston
| L 103–121
| James Worthy (22)
| Kurt Rambis (9)
| Magic Johnson (13)
| Boston Garden14,890
| 2–3
|- align="center" bgcolor="#ccffcc"
| 6
| June 10
| Boston
| W 119–108
| Kareem Abdul-Jabbar (30)
| Kareem Abdul-Jabbar (10)
| Magic Johnson (10)
| The Forum17,505
| 3–3
|- align="center" bgcolor="#ffcccc"
| 7
| June 12
| @ Boston
| L 102–111
| James Worthy (21)
| Kurt Rambis (9)
| Magic Johnson (15)
| Boston Garden14,890
| 3–4
|-

Player statistics

Season

Playoffs

Awards and records
 Kareem Abdul-Jabbar, All-NBA First Team
 Magic Johnson, All-NBA First Team
 Michael Cooper, NBA All-Defensive First Team
 Kareem Abdul-Jabbar, NBA All-Defensive Second Team
 Byron Scott, NBA All-Rookie Team 1st Team

Transactions

References

External links
 Lakers History: 1983–84 on NBA.com
 
 

Los
Los Angeles Lakers seasons
Western Conference (NBA) championship seasons
Los Angle
Los Angle